The West Perry School District is a midsized, public school district located in western Perry County, Pennsylvania. As one of Perry County's four school districts, West Perry serves: the boroughs of Blain, New Bloomfield and Landisburg, as well as Carroll Township, Centre Township, Jackson Township, Northeast Madison Township, Saville Township, Spring Township, Southwest Madison Township, Toboyne Township, and Tyrone Township, making it the largest school district in terms of area in Perry County. According to 2008 local census data, West Perry School District had a resident population of 17,101 people. According to the US Census Bureau, by 2010, the district's population had grown to 19,005 people. In 2010, the educational attainment levels, for the population 25 and over, was 83.3% high school graduates and 14.5% college graduates.

Per the Pennsylvania Budget and Policy Center, 36.7% of the district's pupils lived at 185% or below the Federal Poverty level as shown by their eligibility for the federal free or reduced price school meal programs in 2012. In 2013 the Pennsylvania Department of Education, reported that 25 students in the West Perry School District were homeless. In 2009, the district residents' per capita income was $17,802, while the median family income was $47,210 a year. In Perry County, the median household income was $57,375. In the Commonwealth, the median family income was $49,501 and the United States median family income was $49,445, in 2010. In 2014, the median household income in the USA was $53,700.

West Perry School District operates three elementary schools (K-5th): 
Blain Elementary School, 
Carroll Elementary School, 
New Bloomfield Elementary School
West Perry Middle School (6th −8th)
West Perry High School (9th–12th)

Additionally, the district operates Hidden Valley School which is a full-time emotional support facility for students who benefit from an alternate educational setting. Hidden Valley students are in grades 6–12 from the West Perry School District, along with students from other districts in Perry County.

West Perry High School students may choose to attend Cumberland Perry Area Vocational Technical School which is located in Mechanicsburg, Pennsylvania. CPAVTA provides training in the: construction and mechanical trades, culinary arts, health aids, computer technical careers and other fields. Students may also attend Capital Area Online Learning Association (CAOLA) online education programs. The service is operated by the CAIU15. The Capital Area Intermediate Unit IU15 also provides West Perry School District with a wide variety of services, like: specialized education for disabled students; hearing, speech and visual disability services and professional development for staff and faculty.

Extracurriculars
West Perry School District schools offer a wide variety of clubs, activities and an extensive sports program. Eligibility for participation is determined by school board policies.

Athletics
West Perry's 1989 football team was the last undefeated team in Pennsylvania not to make the state playoffs, a distinction that the school may hold forever since the playoff format has been massively expanded since. Ten years later the football team, led by future University of Georgia and Baltimore Ravens running back Musa Smith, became the first squad in school history to make the post-season. The team faced the Central York Panthers in the first round of the playoffs, winning by a score of 42–0, making the Panthers the eighth team that season the Mustangs had forced the "mercy rule" upon.  In the second game, the district finals, the Mustangs faced the Manheim Central Barons (winners of the 10 previous District 3 AAA championships) and were not so fortunate, losing 28–21 with the game ending as West Perry reached the opponent's 1-yard line.

The West Perry baseball team won consecutive state AA titles in 1979 and 1980. The West Perry boys basketball team reached the state AAA semi-finals in 2006.

The district funds:

Boys
Baseball - AAA
Basketball- AAA
Cross Country - AA
Football - AAA
Soccer - AA
Track and Field - AAA
Wrestling - AAA

Girls
Basketball - AAA
Cheer - AAAA (added 2014)
Cross Country - AA
Field Hockey - AA
Soccer (Fall) - AA
Softball - AAA
Track and Field - AAA
Volleyball - AA

Middle School Sports

Boys
Basketball
Football
Soccer
Track and Field
Wrestling	

Girls
Basketball
Field Hockey
Soccer (Fall)
Track and Field
Volleyball 

According to PIAA directory July 2014 The Schools are in PIAA District 3.

References

School districts established in 1963
Susquehanna Valley
Education in Harrisburg, Pennsylvania
School districts in Perry County, Pennsylvania
Education in Perry County, Pennsylvania
1963 establishments in Pennsylvania